Robert Adam Madden (born 25 October 1978) is a Scottish football referee.

Madden became a FIFA referee in 2010. He officiated in 2014 World Cup qualifiers, beginning with the match between Germany and the Faroe Islands. He left the FIFA list in 2022, as he moved from Scotland to England and started officiating in EFL League One and EFL League Two games.

References

External links
Biography at worldreferee.com

1978 births
Living people
Scottish football referees
Sportspeople from East Kilbride
Scottish Professional Football League referees
Scottish Football League referees
Scottish Premier League referees
English Football League referees